Greece has an embassy in Berlin and five General Consulates in Hamburg, Munich, Düsseldorf, Stuttgart and Frankfurt. Germany has an embassy in Athens and a General Consulate in Thessaloniki. Germany and Greece are full members of the Organization for Security and Co-operation in Europe, of the Organisation for Economic Co-operation and Development, of NATO, of the European Union, and of the Eurozone.

Germany was quite popular in Greece before the Greek government-debt crisis; 78.5% of Greeks had a positive opinion of Germany in 2005. By 2010, 29% shared that opinion. Today, Germany’s image in Greece has rebounded and significantly improved. In 2012, 49% of Greeks had a very unfavorable opinion of Germany, but by 2021 this number decreased to 29%. German Chancellor Angela Merkel was viewed in a very negative light by 76% of Greeks in 2012. By 2021, it was 45%.

History of bilateral relations

Diplomatic relations between Byzantine Greeks and Germans trace back to the Middle Ages and the Byzantine Empire.

The first King of independent Greece, Otto I, was of German descent, and many Bavarians came and settled in the new state, while his father, Ludwig I of Bavaria, had aided financially and politically the Greeks during their War of Independence and after the enthronement of his son.

Greece and Prussia established diplomatic relations in 1834, the same year both countries exchanged embassies.

The two countries were enemies during both World Wars, with Germany taking part in the Axis Occupation of Greece during World War II. The issue of reparations for German war crimes and the forced loan during the occupation continues to be unsettled.

There is a 300,000 people Greek community living in Germany, most of them came during the 1960s and 1970s.

The two nations enjoyed excellent relations from 1950 to 2010, with Germany being the nation with the most tourists visiting Greece during the 1970s, 1980s, 1990s, and 2000s and the European country which received the most Greek immigrants, mainly in the 1950s and 1960s. Moreover, Greece supported German reunification during the 1980s and the two countries cooperated in many sectors (cultural, technological, military etc.) under the EU spectrum.

In 1999, the Greek foreign minister Theodoros Pangalos caused a diplomatic crisis when he stated that "Germany is politically a dwarf" and later apologized.

However, relations were severely strained during the European sovereign-debt crisis between the nations. Although many media outlets in both countries tried to damage relations through polemical reporting, there was an initiative to counteract this. The most known is the founding of the German-Greek Youth organisation (Deutsch-griechisches Jugendwerk).

In general, German-Greek relations are considered to be balanced, and at European level the countries work well together. Germany has supported Greece in their dispute with Turkey, but not as much as other countries like France. The German minister Heiko Maas has said : "[...]Germany and the whole European Union stand by Greece in firm solidarity". Germany limited the arm sales to Turkey, but they excluded maritime equipment. Germany was also hesitant when the EU wanted to impose sanctions on Turkey , but they have said that sanction is an option and that the provocation of Turkey is unacceptable.   It should be mentioned that Germany has already provided Greece with 4 U-214 submarines that Greece desires not to be sold, also to Turkey.

German community of Greece 

The German Archaeological Institute at Athens opened in 1874, the German School of Athens in 1896.

List of bilateral treaties
 Bilateral cultural agreement, 17 May 1956
 Treaty of residence and shipping, 2 September 1961, which also addresses military conscription matters for persons with dual nationality
 Agreement for the avoidance of double taxation, 18 April 1966
After 1981, most agreements were made through the European Union.

List of recent bilateral visits
 April 2000: visit by President of Germany Johannes Rau
 22 January 2004: visit by Greek Foreign Minister George Papandreou
 December 3, 2004: visit by Greek Foreign Minister Petros Molyviatis
 15–16 February 2006: visit by Greek Prime Minister Kostas Karamanlis and Greek Foreign Minister Dora Bakoyannis
 23 June 2006: visit by Germany Foreign Minister Frank-Walter Steinmeier
 18–22 September 2006: visit by President of Greece Karolos Papoulias
 20 July 2007: visit by Chancellor of Germany Angela Merkel

Diplomacy

Republic of Germany
Athens (Embassy)
Thessaloniki (Consulate-General)

Hellenic Republic
Berlin (Embassy)
Düsseldorf (Consulate-General)
Frankfurt (Consulate-General)
Hamburg (Consulate-General)
Munich (Consulate-General)
Stuttgart (Consulate-General)

Embassies 
The Embassy of Germany is located in Athens, Greece. The Embassy of Greece is located in Berlin, Germany.

See also
Foreign relations of Germany
Foreign relations of Greece
Greeks in Germany
Germany–Turkey relations

Notes

External links
 German embassy in Athens (in German and Greek only)
Greek Ministry of Foreign Affairs about the relation with Germany
Greek embassy in Berlin (in German and Greek only)

 
Greece
Germany